I Was an Adventuress is a 1940 American drama film directed by Gregory Ratoff, starring Vera Zorina, Richard Greene, Erich von Stroheim, and Peter Lorre. Actress/ballerina Countess Tanya Vronsky (Vera Zorina) works as decoy for two international con artists Andre Desormeaux (Erich von Stroheim) and Polo (Peter Lorre).

Plot
Countess Tanya Vronsky acts as bait for notorious jewel thief Andre Desormeaux and his assistant, Polo, on their tour through Europe. Everything goes according to plan until Tanya falls in love with their next target, Paul Vernay. Still, the gang manages to victimize Paul. After the heist, Tanya announces that she is retiring and goes on to marry Paul. Desormeaux tries to convince her to change her mind, but in vain.

They meet again months later in Paris, and Desormeaux makes another attempt at persuading the countess to work with them again. In order to get rid of them for good, she pretends to go along with their plans, but instead sets them up to make them think she has been arrested.

However, her plan is thwarted, and her two accomplices come to her home during a party and pretend to be guests. They manage to steal the guests' jewels and escape. Before they leave, Desormeaux blackmails Tanya, threatening to tell Paul about her past if he does not get 200,000 francs.

The theft is soon discovered, and Paul and Tanya go after the thieves in their car. On the way, Paul learns about Tanya's background and forgives her. While they are away, Polo returns to their house in a sudden change of heart, and gives back the jewels. Meanwhile, Desormeaux is boarding a ship to America.

Paul and Tanya come back and discover that the jewels have been returned. They forgive Polo. Tanya entertains her guests at the Vernay mansion by performing a dance from the ballet Swan Lake.

Polo then boards the ship, pretending to still have the jewels in a briefcase. He then "accidentally" drops the suitcase in the water.

Cast

 Vera Zorina as Countess Tanya Vronsky (as Zorina)  
 Richard Greene as Paul Vernay  
 Erich von Stroheim as Andre Desormeaux (as Erich Von Stroheim)  
 Peter Lorre as Polo  
 Sig Ruman as Herr Protz (as Sig Rumann)  
 Fritz Feld as Henri Gautier  
 Cora Witherspoon as Aunt Cecile  
 Anthony Kemble-Cooper as Cousin Emil (as Anthony Kemple Cooper)  
 Paul Porcasi as Fisherman  
 Inez Palange as Fisherman's Wife  
 Egon Brecher as Jacques Dubois  
 Roger Imhof as Henrich Von Kongen  
 Rolfe Sedan as Waiter  
 Eddie Conrad as Waiter  
 Fortunio Bonanova as Orchestra Leader
 George Balanchine as Ballet Dancer 
 Lew Christensen as Ballet Dancer
 Phyllis Barry as Englishwoman at Exhibit
 Charles Laskey as Ballet Dancer
 Ellinor Vanderveer as Englishwoman at Exhibit

Notes
 Vera Zorina, whose real name was Brigita Hartwig, was married to dance director George Balanchine.
 The twelve-minute ballet sequence of Swan Lake was the longest ballet scene to appear in any film to date. For the scene, a $15,000 all-glass set, the first of its kind, was built using  of  plate glass.

References

External links 
 
 
 
 

1940 films
American black-and-white films
American heist films
1940 drama films
American drama films
Films set in Paris
American remakes of French films
Films directed by Gregory Ratoff
20th Century Fox films
1940s English-language films
1940s American films